Qutbewal Gujjran is a village in the Punjab, India. It is located in Ludhiana West tehsil of Ludhiana district.

Administration
The village is administrated by a Sarpanch who is an elected representative of village as per constitution of India and a Panchayati Raj.

Villages in Ludhiana West Tehsil

Air travel connectivity 
The closest airport to the village is Sahnewal Airport.

References

Villages in Ludhiana West tehsil